The Sōtetsu–JR Direct Line is a section of the  project, built by the Japan Railway Construction, Transport and Technology Agency (JRTT). It connects the Sōtetsu Main Line to the JR East Saikyō Line, via the tracks of the Sōtetsu Shin-Yokohama Line and the Tōkaidō Freight Line. This service is publicly referred to as a Sotetsu Direct Line by JR East, and as a JR Direct Line by the Sagami Railway.

Services 
JR through service trains enter the Tōkaido Freight Line once leaving Hazawa yokohama-kokudai Station, via the Tokyo-side of Yokohama-Hazawa Freight Station, then enters the Yokosuka Line tracks near Tsurumi Station. The service shares the same route as the Shōnan–Shinjuku Line, heading inbound towards Musashi-Kosugi, Ōsaki, Shibuya, and Shinjuku.

Trains operate from Ebina on the Sotetsu Main Line, via Nishiya, Musashi-Kosugi, and enter the Saikyō Line at Ōsaki. Trains will mostly terminate at Shinjuku. In the morning rush hours, some trains go further north towards Musashi-Urawa, Ōmiya, Sashiōgi (where the Kawagoe Line depot is located), and as far as Kawagoe. A total of 46 round trips will be operated every day, with a rush-hour frequency of 4 trains per hour, and off-peak frequency of 2-3 trains per hour.

The fastest travel times are 44 minutes between Futamatagawa and Shinjuku, 45 minutes between Yamato and Shibuya, and 36 minutes between Ebina and Musashi-Kosugi.

Service types 

  Local (各停), stopping at all stations
  Limited Express (特急), stopping at all stations on the JR lines.
 However, when Limited Express trains are on the JR line, they are displayed as Local instead.

Past proposal 
Past proposals also suggested Sōtetsu trains to operate through services with the Ueno-Tokyo Line, towards the Utsunomiya, Takasaki and Jōban Lines. This requires trains to cross over level junctions to enter Tōkaido Line tracks near Tsurumi or Shinagawa (or somewhere in between), which would possibly undermine the high density train operations in this section, if no dedicated grade separation is built. Thus the idea was scrapped due to these difficulties.

Nomenclature

Limited Express stations

References 

Lines of East Japan Railway Company
Lines of Sagami Railway
Railway lines in Tokyo
Railway lines opened in 2019
2019 establishments in Japan
Railway lines in Kanagawa Prefecture
1067 mm gauge railways in Japan